Brian O'Neal Williams (born February 15, 1969) is a former Major League Baseball player. A pitcher, Williams played for the Houston Astros (1992–1995, and 1999), San Diego Padres (1995), Detroit Tigers (1996), Baltimore Orioles (1997), Fukuoka Daiei Hawks (1998), and Chicago Cubs and Cleveland Indians (2000).

External links

1969 births
Living people
Major League Baseball pitchers
Cleveland Indians players
Houston Astros players
San Diego Padres players
Detroit Tigers players
Baltimore Orioles players
Chicago Cubs players
Baseball players from South Carolina
American expatriate baseball players in Japan
Fukuoka Daiei Hawks players
People from Lancaster, South Carolina
Auburn Astros players
Osceola Astros players
Jackson Generals (Texas League) players
Tucson Toros players
Toledo Mud Hens players
Rochester Red Wings players
Buffalo Bisons (minor league) players
Pawtucket Red Sox players
Columbus Clippers players
Atlantic City Surf players